Epameinondas-Savvas "Nondas" Papantoniou (alternate spellings: Epaminondas, Epameinontas, Nontas) (Greek: Επαμεινώνδας-Σάββας "Νώντας" Παπαντωνίου; born 28 April 1990) is a Greek professional basketball player for Iraklis of the Greek A2 Basket League. He is a 1.91 m (6 ft 3 in) tall combo guard.

Professional career
Papantoniou began his professional career in the 2007–08 season with the Greek League club Maroussi. After two seasons, he moved to AEK Athens. He then moved to Ilysiakos. He joined Peristeri in 2011 and spent two seasons there. He moved to Kolossos in 2013. Papantoniou returned to AEK Athens in 2014. 

On August 18, 2015, Papantoniou extended his contract with AEK Athens for another two years, but left the team halfway through that contract.

On December 11, 2016, Papantoniou joined Força Lleida of the LEB Oro. On January 22, 2017, he returned to Greece and joined Promitheas Patras for the rest of the season.

On September 30, 2018, due to the injuries of Phil Goss and Apollon Tsochlas, Papantoniou joined PAOK on a monthly contract. He was released on November 4, 2018. Papantoniou then finished the season with Panionios, leading them to avoid relegation, with an average of 11.3 points and 3.9 assists per game.

Papantoniou spent the 2019–20 season with Larisa, having a career-high 11 points and 5 assists per game. 

On July 23, 2020, he agreed on a two-year contract with his former team PAOK, thus returning to Thessaloniki. On June 23, 2021, PAOK opted out of their contract and Papantoniou became a free agent. 

He signed back with Larisa on November 10, 2021, after starting the season in Romania with Craiova. In 30 league games, he averaged 2.9 points, 1.5 rebounds and 1 assist, playing around 12 minutes per contest.

National team career
As a member of the junior national basketball teams of Greece, Papantoniou played at the 2006 FIBA Europe Under-16 Championship. He won the gold medal at the 2008 FIBA Europe Under-18 Championship, and the silver medal at the 2009 FIBA Under-19 World Championship. He also won the silver medal at the 2010 FIBA Europe Under-20 Championship.

References

External links
Euroleague.net Profile
Eurobasket.com Profile
FIBA Profile
Greek Basket League Profile 
Hellenic Federation Profile 
AEK Profile

1990 births
Living people
AEK B.C. players
Araberri BC players
Basketball players at the 2015 European Games
European Games competitors for Greece
Força Lleida CE players
Greek Basket League players
Greek expatriate basketball people in Romania
Greek expatriate basketball people in Spain
Greek men's basketball players
Gymnastikos S. Larissas B.C. players
Ilysiakos B.C. players
Iraklis Thessaloniki B.C. players
Kolossos Rodou B.C. players
Larisa B.C. players
Maroussi B.C. players
Panionios B.C. players
P.A.O.K. BC players
Peristeri B.C. players
Point guards
Promitheas Patras B.C. players
Shooting guards
Basketball players from Athens